John West Hugall  ( – 30 October 1880) was an English Gothic Revival architect from Yorkshire.

Career
Hugall's works span the period 1848–78. He was elected a Fellow of the Royal Institute of British Architects in 1871.

Hugall spent an early part of his career in Pontefract, Yorkshire. While there he was Secretary of the Yorkshire Architectural Society (now the Yorkshire Architectural and York Archaeological Society). In 1848 he co-wrote a book, The Churches of Scarborough, Filey, And The Neighbourhood and An Historical and Descriptive Guide to York Cathedral and Its Antiquities.(1850) with the Rev. G.A. Poole.

Hugall seems to have moved his practice to Cheltenham by about 1850 and to Reading and Oxford by 1871.

Work

Buildings
St. Edmund's parish church, Wellingborough Road, Northampton, 1850
All Saints' parish church, Durrington, Wiltshire, 1851
St. Michael's parish church, Figheldean, Wiltshire: rebuilt top of bell tower, 1851
All Saints' parish church, Faringdon, Berkshire (now Oxfordshire): south transept and west chapel, 1853
St Cuthbert's parish church, Ackworth, West Yorkshire: renovated nave 1852–1854
St. James' parish church, Winterbourne, Berkshire: rebuilt church, 1854
St. Mary's parish church, Kingskerswell, Devon: restored circa 1856
St. Mary's parish church, St Marychurch, Torquay, Devon: 1856–61 (rebuilt in 1950s after war damage)
St. James' parish church, Bourton, Berkshire (now Oxfordshire), 1860 or 1881
St. John the Evangelist parish church, Fernham, Berkshire (now Oxfordshire), 1861
All Saints' Church, Lullington, Derbyshire 1861 - 1862 restoration.
St. Leonard's parish church, Stanton Fitzwarren, Wiltshire: restoration, 1865
St Michael and St Mary Magdalene's Church, Easthampstead, Bracknell, Berkshire, 1866–67
St. Michael's parish church, Little Marcle, Herefordshire, 1870
St. Leonard's parish church, Sherfield on Loddon, Hampshire: spire, 1872
St. Mary's parish church, Chieveley, Berkshire: rebuilt nave, 1873
St. James' parish church, Welland, Worcestershire, 1875
All Saints' parish church, East Garston, Berkshire: rebuilt chancel, 1875
All Saints' parish church, Staunton, Gloucestershire: restoration, 1871-72

Writing

References

Sources

19th-century English architects
English ecclesiastical architects
Gothic Revival architects
1806 births
Date of birth missing
1880 deaths
Fellows of the Royal Institute of British Architects
People from Sculcoates
Architects from Yorkshire